Chamaesphecia mysiniformis is a moth of the family Sesiidae. It is native to the Iberian Peninsula, southern France, and northern Morocco, but has been introduced to Victoria, Australia in 1997.

Adults are dark brown, except some yellow marks on the body and some white rings on the abdomen. They have a clear area on their wings.

The larvae feed on Marrubium vulgare, Marrubium alysson, Marrubium supinum, Ballota nigra, Ballota hirsuta, Stachys germanica, Stachys ocymastrum, Stachys circinata and Sideritis montana.

External links
Australian Insects
Fauna Europaea
Classification of the Superfamily Sesioidea (Lepidoptera: Ditrysia)

Moths described in 1840
Moths of Australia
Sesiidae
Moths of Europe
Lepidoptera of North Africa